Khosrow Khan Ardalan was the Ardalan beglerbeg (governor) of Kurdistan from 1680 to 1682. He was unpopular amongst his subjects, who claimed that his rule was oppressive. He was counselled several times to improve his way of governing, but they all proved ineffective. As a result, he was summoned to Isfahan, where he was executed at the Royal Square (Maydan-e Shah). He was replaced by Timur Khan Ajarlu Shamlu, the first non-Kurdish governor of the province.

References

Sources 
 
 

Ardalan
Year of birth unknown
1682 deaths
People executed by Safavid Iran
17th-century people of Safavid Iran
17th-century Kurdish people
Safavid governors of Kurdistan